Lesley Daly (born 28 June 1966) is an Australian trampoline gymnast who competed at the Athens 2004 Olympic Games.

Daly was born in Bedford, England on 28 June 1966. She grew up in Biloela, near Rockhampton.

At the Athens 2004 Olympics Forbes, aged 38, was the oldest trampolining competitor. She competed in the women's individual trampoline event and finished thirteenth.

References 

1966 births
Living people
Gymnasts at the 2004 Summer Olympics
Australian female trampolinists
Olympic gymnasts of Australia
People from Biloela